Merophyas siniodes is a species of moth of the family Tortricidae. It is found in Australia, where it has been recorded from South Australia.

The wingspan is 17.5-21 mm. The forewings are white, finely reticulated and strigulated (finely streaked) with greyish yellow. The hindwings are white.

References

	

Moths described in 1945
Archipini